Bargunyah is a rural locality in the Maranoa Region, Queensland, Australia.

Bargunyah's postcode is 4488.

References 

Maranoa Region
Localities in Queensland